Buenavista, officially the Municipality of Buenavista,  is a 4th class municipality in the province of Quezon, Philippines. According to the 2020 census, it has a population of 31,160 people.

It was formerly known as Piris. It is accessible by land via Lopez and Catanauan or by water transportation via Guinayangan from Lucena City.

Etymology
Formerly known as Piris, Buenavista is now its official name from the Spanish words buena vista which means good view, nice view or good sight in the English language. Its original name was Piri as engraved in the oldest church bell which was donated by one Don Jose Casal in the year 1866. It used to be located in the Sitio of Pinagbayanan situated in the western side of the Piris River which is about one a half kilometers away from the present town site. It was a mere hamlet of the municipality of Guinanyagan, province of Quezon and remained as such for quite a number of years until it finally became a municipality. This place became the choice of the founders who were a mixture of Bicolanos and Visayans to enable them to easily escape the Moro raids that were prevalent during the olden times. When the raids finally subsided, the barrio of Piris was transferred to its present location. The word Piri was changed to Piris and later re-changed to Piris.

History

In October 1936, some civic minded residents launched the proposition of making the place a municipality. They signed a petition for the separation of Piris from the municipality of Guinayangan. A group of seven members was formed and was commissioned to undertake a delegation to the Office of the Secretary of the Interior for the purpose. The group was composed of then Don Feliciano Roldan, Mariano San Jose, Honorio Hutamares, Teodorico Dosto, Ciriaco Parraba, Antonio Pasta and Francisco San Jose. The outbreak of the second global war marked the failure of the offices concerned to convert the place into a regular municipality.

After the election of Gaudencio V. Vera to the Office of the Congressman for the second district of Quezon Province, Francisco San Jose, a native and public teacher of the place, was instructed by Congressman Vera to help prepare the necessary papers pertaining to the separation of Piris from Guinayangan. When the papers were prepared, House Bill No. 83 was passed by both houses of Congress and became Republic Act No. 495 under Proclamation No. 201 by President Elpidio Quirino, the corporate existence of Piris in the name Buenavista the 37th municipality of Quezon province, was fixed on 26 August 1950. An inauguration was celebrated by the town people under the leadership of Domingo Reyes and Yao Ching Kio, wealthy businessman of the place, with Congressman Vera as the guest of honor. When the municipality of Buenavista was inaugurated on August 26, 1950, it belonged to the seventh class. Six months thereafter, due to some increase in revenue, it rose to sixth class. Francisco Falqueza was appointed Municipal Mayor and held office beginning August 26, 1950, up to December 31, 1951, and on November 13, 1951, local election Primitivo Pasta Sr. becoming the first elected mayor.

Geography
The municipality of Buenavista is located in the eastern part of Quezon Province at the base of the Bondoc Peninsula. It is bounded on the northern part by Guinayangan, on the south by the town of San Narciso, on the western part by Lopez and Catanauan, and on the east by the Ragay Gulf facing Bicol Region.

Topography
Buenavista is primarily upland municipality characterized by ragged terrain, generally hilly or mountainous with high plains, valleys and swamps. It lies on different slopes from 0-15% and above. There are three types of soil that covers the municipality. These are Faraon Clay, Catanauan Clay loam and Bolinao Clay loam. This is the most extensive upland soil of the province mostly found in Bondoc Peninsula. Faraon Clay loam covers about 13,133.75 hectares which is 85% of the total land area of the municipality, 10%is said to be catanauan Clay loam and 5% of the total land area in Bolinao Clay loam. The greater portion of the soil types is used for grazing. The low-lying hills are planted to coconut and seasonal crops like corn, root crops, and fruit bearing trees.

Catanauan Clay loam is found in the valley is used mostly on paddy rice field, while Bolinao Clay loam is devoted to coconut, bananas and other crops and some part has a mineral deposit like in Barangay Bulo and Cadlit.

Barangays

Buenavista is politically subdivided into 37 barangays.

 Bagong Silang
 Batabat Norte
 Batabat Sur
 Buenavista
 Bukal
 Bulo
 Cabong
 Cadlit
 Catulin
 Cawa
 De La Paz
 Del Rosario
 Hagonghong
 Ibabang Wasay
 Ilayang Wasay
 Lilukin
 Mabini
 Mabutag
 Magallanes
 Maligaya (Esperanza)
 Manlana
 Masaya
 Poblacion
 Rizal
 Sabang Pinamasagan
 Sabang Piris
 San Diego
 San Isidro Ibaba
 San Isidro Ilaya
 San Pablo
 San Pedro (Villa Rodrigo)
 San Vicente
 Siain
 Villa Aurora
 Villa Batabat
 Villa Magsaysay
 Villa Veronica

Climate

Its climate is classified as type 3 which means the rainfall is evenly distributed throughout the year.

Demographics

Languages
The main language is Tagalog, although the Bicolanos, Visayan and Ilocano languages are commonly used in the barangays.

Religions
 Roman Catholic
 Iglesia Ni Cristo
 Church Of God
 Seventh-Day Adventist
 Born Again
 Baptist
 Islam
 Jehovah's Witnesses

Economy

Government

Elected officials

List of former chief executives
Francisco Falqueza (appointed) Aug.26, 1950–Dec.31, 1951
Primitivo Pasta Sr. (first elected Mayor) 1951–1955
Eustaquio Cawa 1955–1963
Domingo Reyes 1963-1986
Edgardo San Juan (elected Vice Mayor acted as OIC-mayor early 1982–1986)
Alex Ang (OIC-Mayor) 1986-1987
Vicente Cawa 1988-1995
Florencio Villamater 1995-2001
Ramon Reyes 2001-2007
Ma. Remedios Rivera 2007-2016
Alexander Rivera 2016–2019
Ma. Remedious Rivera 2019–2022

References

External links
Buenavista Profile at PhilAtlas.com
[ Philippine Standard Geographic Code]
Philippine Census Information
Local Governance Performance Management System

Municipalities of Quezon